St. Matthew's School in the West Side neighborhood of Saint Paul, Minnesota, USA, is a 1902 school designed by John F. Fisher; it originally served German immigrants and now serves the local Hispanic community. It is listed on the National Register of Historic Places. The building is now used by the West Side Summit charter school.

References

External links
West Side Summit

Defunct schools in Minnesota
Educational institutions established in 1902
National Register of Historic Places in Saint Paul, Minnesota
1902 establishments in Minnesota
School buildings on the National Register of Historic Places in Minnesota
Second Empire architecture in Minnesota